The following places in Germany are called Kaulsdorf:

 Kaulsdorf (Berlin), a quarter in the borough Marzahn-Hellersdorf of Berlin
 Kaulsdorf station, a railway station
 Kaulsdorf (Saale), a municipality in the district Saalfeld-Rudolstadt, in Thuringia